Winkel is a commune in the Haut-Rhin department in Alsace in north-eastern France.

The river Ill takes its source in the village. Its inhabitants are called Winkelois and Winkeloises.

Population

See also
 Communes of the Haut-Rhin department

References

Communes of Haut-Rhin